King in Black is a comic book event written by Donny Cates with art by Ryan Stegman, and was published from 2020 to 2021 by Marvel Comics. It is a continuation to 2019's Absolute Carnage, also containing fallout from 2020's Empyre. In the story, Knull and his symbiotes invade Earth, leaving Eddie Brock / Venom, the Avengers, the X-Men, and numerous other superheroes to protect it.

Plot

Prelude
At the time when the Guardians of the Galaxy were investigating the death of Zn'rx Emperor Stote during the Galactic Council's meeting at the Proscenium and find that the Chitauri Peacekeeper and the Elders of the Universe member Profiteer were responsible sometime after the events of the "Empyre" storyline, Zoralis Gupa of the planet Silnius takes an urgent call while mentioning to the person on the other side to warn all neighboring systems. He tells Victoria that it's the End of Everything as different planets are starting to die in the planets owned by the Shi'ar, the Kree/Skrull Alliance, and the Zn'rx while rendering the galactic economy fragile enough to go bankrupt. Knowing that she won't make a profit, the Profiteer teleports Peacekeeper and the bio-bomb away. While thanking Zoralis Gupa for fooling the Profiteer with the bluff, Zoralis Gupa states to Super-Skrull and everyone present that something darker than Galactus is destroying the worlds and its name is Knull.

Emperor Hulkling dispatched Talos to investigate the Kree and Skrull bases that went dark with Av-Rom, Keeyah, M'lanz, Virtue, and Tarna. Two days later, a Kree/Skrull Alliance armada headed by General Kalamari finds Talos' escape pod. After recuperating in the sick bay, Talos recaps to Kalamari about what happened on his mission that involved an encounter with Knull. Talos then informs Kalamari that his distress beacon on his escape pod is a warning that Knull is coming. Outside the ship, Knull is riding a Symbiote Dragon as he swoops in for an attack.

At Ravencroft, Alistair Smythe is visited by a figure who is borrowing the form of Spencer Smythe so that it can speak to him and proposes that it helps it out. In the Blue Area of the Moon, Uatu the Watcher comments to the readers about the Watchers' vow not to interfere as a blue fire hits him. After rescuing a boy, Spider-Man shifts the symbiote into his work clothes and goes to meet with J. Jonah Jameson. He assigns Peter to work with Ned Leeds on an assignment where Alistair Smythe claims to have found a cure for paralysis. Uatu finds himself in a memory-scanning machine operated by Kang the Conqueror who is trying to save the universe. When the machine causes Uatu to overload it with psychic energy upon it mentioning about Knull, Kang's ship is destroyed leaving him adrift in space. As Spider-Man and Ned visit Ravencroft, the entity possessing Alistair has already hooked up a tank to Ravencroft's ventilation system while having gotten a glimpse of the Shadow Realm. Upon his spider-senses going off upon entering Ravencroft and an eclipse happening in the sky, Peter calls out to Ned only to be confronted by the entity's slaves who identifies Ned as one of them. Dodging the slaves while changing into Spider-Man, he confronts Alistair Smythe who is now being controlled by the entity and accuses him of being behind this attack. The entity introduces itself as Mister E who calls the suit on Peter Parker it's brother. As Spider-Man fights Mister E, he learns from it that he and the suit are from the same "father". During the fight, Mister E is confronted by Black Knight who stabs Mister E with his Ebony Blade. While cryptically revealing that uncreation is moving backwards, Mister E disappears. Both Spider-Man and Black Knight aren't sure what to do next. While drifting through space, Kang is picked up by a spaceship where he encounters Rocket Raccoon.

Main plot
While overlooking Manhattan's night life, Eddie Brock senses that Knull is coming to Earth. While transforming into Venom, Eddie contacts the Avengers to let them know about Knull's arrival. His son Dylan states that he can sense that Knull is coming. At Avengers Mountain, Captain America, Iron Man, She-Hulk, and Captain Marvel scan for Knull's approach as Iron Man turns the derelict Kree and Skrull warships left behind from their war with the Cotati into a minefield. When thousands of Symbiote Dragons start to arrive, Iron Man detonates the warships which kills half of the Symbiote Dragons. The Avengers and the Fantastic Four arrive to combat the Symbiote Dragons while Eddie places Dylan in the same bunker that was used by Ezekiel which Spider-Man loaned to him. As Venom is contact by Captain America telling him to go to Plan B, the Avengers and the Fantastic Four work with Spider-Man, Doctor Strange, Daredevil, Iron Fist, and Luke Cage into fighting the Symbiote Dragons while making use of lightning which weakens them. As Thor is unable to be reached, Professor X contacts the group stating that he has offered the aid of the X-Men and has dispatched Storm, Cyclops, Wolverine, Jean Grey, Cable, and Magneto to Washington Square Park as Storm starts to blast lightning towards the Symbiote Dragon. After Eddie pays a visit to the ruins of the Spire that was used as Dark Carnage's lair, he notes that Knull will work to take control of the Venom symbiote again. Doctor Strange uses every method to call for reinforcements as one of the Symbiote Dragons swallows him. Breaking free from the Symbiote Hive, Eddie warns everyone that Knull is coming with the Symbiote-possessed Celestials Arishem the Judge and Tefral the Surveyor. Knull begins his search for the one called Brock. When Captain America gives the command to the other heavy hitter they enlisted, it turns out to be Sentry. He takes Knull into Earth's orbit and tried to do the same thing he once did to Carnage only for Knull to do a reversal upon being familiar with what happened to Carnage that time. Knull breaks Sentry and assimilates the Void into him upon it emerging from Sentry's body. Venom and Captain America react to this as Iron Man urges them to retreat. Knull then proceeds to have his Symbiote Dragon form a sphere around Earth to cut it off from the Sun and has the living abyss swallow some of the superheroes including Storm which Professor X reacts to. Eddie contacts Iron Man informing him that he and the Venom symbiote are going to try a hail mary plan so that he can buy Iron Man some time to come up with a plan to defeat Knull. As Venom, Eddie goes to confront Knull and offer his services to him. Knull grabs Venom as he recognizes Eddie as the one who killed Grendel, then he states to Eddie that the Brock he is looking for is Dylan Brock. When Eddie begs for Knull to take him instead, Knull rips the Venom symbiote off him and absorbs it into his body while planning to absorb Dylan into him as well. Eddie is then dropped by Knull into the symbiote-covered streets below as Captain America, Daredevil, Doctor Strange, Iron Fist, Ms. Marvel, Storm, and Thing are possessed by the Symbiotes.

Eddie Brock slams onto a car, critically injuring himself. Spider-Man appears and tries to help him as the symbiote-possessed Avengers arrive. Human Torch shoots a fire blast and tells Spider-Man to take Eddie to the Fantastic Four lab so he can get treated. Spider-Man takes Eddie Brock to the Fantastic Four lab while Human Torch buys them time before being possessed. Valkyrie tells Spider-Man that Eddie Brock is barely alive and they need to do something quick. Spider-Man meets up with Dylan and tells him that his father is still alive but barely. The two of them go to the Fantastic Four lab where Blade is arguing with Professor X and Magneto while Black Panther is talking to Reed Richards, Sue Storm, and Jane Foster on what to do. They are even shown trying to reach Phil Coulson so that they can get aid from the Squadron Supreme. He even inquires about the locations of the Infinity Gems, the Cosmic Cube, and the Ultimate Nullifier. Namor arrives and agrees to help them much to the displeasure of Reed Richards. Iron Man tells the heroes that he has a plan which is to acquire a small part of a symbiote dragon, have Namor wake up the Black Tide (the ancient Atlantean warriors from Namor's teenage days) in the Mariana Trench, have Blade go to Chernobyl in Ukraine to persuade Dracula to help them, and persuade Mayor Wilson Fisk to hire villains to help defend New York City leading to Mayor Fisk to pay a visit to the Bar with No Name. Iron Man manages to take control of a Symbiote Dragon using Extremis and brings the symbiote to Fantastic Four to heal Eddie Brock, but the symbiote starts killing Eddie. Dylan uses his power to completely destroy the Symbiote. Reed Richards realizes that Dylan is his secret weapon. Just then, Eddie flatlines.

Silver Surfer passes by the planets that have been attacked by Knull. Invisible Woman and Blade are being overwhelmed by symbiotes and Mister Fantastic wants Spider-Man and Wolverine to escort Dylan Brock out to free the rest of the symbiotes hordes. The three of them appear to help Invisible Woman and Dylan frees Captain America from his symbiote. Knull finds out where Dylan is and is about to get him when Thor arrives. Together, Thor and Dylan help free some of the possessed heroes. Thor and Knull fight and Thor gains the upper hand until Knull distracts Thor by bringing in his symbiote-possessed Celestials and stabs Thor in the back. Iron Man arrives to use his Extremis-infected Symbiote dragon in order to take control of the symbiote-possessed Celestials. Just before Dylan is about to taken away, Silver Surfer arrives after being summoned by Hugin and Munin.

Knull plans to control Dylan since he has the Symbiote codex, but Dylan fights back freeing Cyclops, Invisible Woman, Dr. Strange, Black Cat and the Human Torch. Doctor Strange morphs into a stronger form and together the heroes fight back against the symbiotes. Namor, Thor and Storm deal heavy damage, while Jean Grey immobilizes Knull with her psychic powers. She sees Knull's past, and realizes that the God of Light (another name for the Enigma Force) is the one thing that can take down Knull before passing out. Silver Surfer arrives to where the Enigma Force is and frees it from the symbiotes. Knull reels in pain and Eddie Brock is chosen to be the new Captain Universe.

As Silver Surfer faces off against him, Knull recalls his previous fight against him. Through the God of Light, Silver Surfer assumes a chrome form and turns his surfboard into a sword while Knull transforms his armor into one that would enable him to combat Silver Surfer. As Knull begins to fight Silver Surfer, the members of the Avengers, Fantastic Four, and X-Men charge towards Knull so that they can aid Silver Surfer. Just then, Venom appears having been transformed into Captain Universe stating that he'll handle Knull from here. As Knull claims that he has killed Venom many times, Venom manages to make use of Mjolnir and Silver Surfer's surfboard which he merged into a battle axe that is the shape of Venom's spider emblem. When Cyclops asks if he is hallucinating, Captain America and Captain Marvel advise Cyclops to get his head into the game as the Symbiote-controlled civilians are closing in on him. Using his battle axe, Venom starts to shred his way through the Symbiote Dragons upon noting that Knull has become afraid of him. Knull even unleashes a Symbiote-controlled Celestial to aid him as Venom beheads it. As Venom rips off Knull's armor, Knull states that the darkness is in Dylan. Venom then picks up Knull, flies into the air, and punches through the Symbiote barrier surrounding Earth where Knull states that the Void is eternal and the abyss has teeth. Venom then states he doesn't care if he rights as he plunges his hand into the sun and uses the Uni-Power to vaporize Knull. Then Eddie hears a lot of voices. The Uni-Power informs Eddie that the Symbiote Hive is celebrating their freedom from Knull. The vampires see that Blade is overpowered and try to attack only to be vanquished when sunlight hits them. With their weapons separated from the battle axe form, Thor and Silver Surfer noted that things will not be back to normal soon. Spider-Man gets confirmation from Eddie that Knull is no more as Dylan embraces him as Venom rips out the Symbiote within Dylan. The Uni-Power then leaves Eddie stating that he has become more than a human as the Venom Symbiote rebonds to Eddie. As Venom sprouts dragon-like wings and flies into the air, the hostless Symbiotes and Symbiote Dragons follow him. The Venom Symbiote translates the Symbiote language to Eddie stating that he is now the new Nexus of the Hive Mind, the new God of the Symbiotes, and the new King in Black.

Subplots
Eddie is in limbo talking with one of the Symbiotes and sees Flash Thompson in his Agent Anti-Venom appearance. Flash reveals that even after he died, his Anti-Venom suit kept a codex of his conscious in the Symbiote hive mind. Flash and Eddie go see the heart of the Symbiote hive mind and Flash sacrifices himself to take control of the Symbiote mind. Knull feels pain, finds Eddie Brock, and grabs him by the throat.

Doctor Doom confronts Iron Man during Knull's invasion at the time when Iron Man was bonded with an Extremis-powered Symbiote. They are attacked by what appears to be a Symbiote-possessed Santa Claus. When the attacks from Iron Man and Santa Claus collide, it purges the Symbiote and Iron Man discovers that Santa Claus is actually a man named Mike Dunworthy who owns a Christmas decoration store. Doctor Doom revealed that he came to Iron Man because he heard about the new armor he is wearing and wants to extrapolate it to improve his own armor only for Iron Man to turn him down. As Iron Man takes off advising him to not let go of the magic in the world, Doctor Doom is left to wonder if Santa Claus could be a Sorcerer Supreme.

Mayor Wilson Fisk decides to put together his own team of superpowered operatives to beat back Knull's creatures and save the city. He secretly meets with eight of these operatives, all known criminals who have been working in the city without Kingpin's blessing: Taskmaster, Mister Fear, Batroc the Leaper, Rhino, Star, Ampere, and Snakehead. To pay Mayor Fisk back, these criminals must escort Star (current keeper of one of the Infinity Gems) into battle to kill Knull, but to do that they'll first need to make contact with a man Kingpin believes can help turn the tide against the god. The criminal Incendiary opts to take his chances in jail instead. When he's taken out of the boardroom by Mayor Fisk's guards, he's immediately shot. The remaining seven criminals then promptly agree to Mayor Fisk's plan. Despite objections, this team will be called "The Thunderbolts" (because Kingpin owns the copyright). The team sets out into the city and is promptly attacked by a giant Symbiote Dragon. Snakehead is devoured, but Mister Fear and Star are able to fell the Symbiote Dragon. The team learns that there's a limit to Star's cosmic powers (she's woozy after battle) and when Ampere exclaims that the team is doomed and he's leaving, Mister Fear murders him. Taskmaster, de facto team leader, scolds Mister Fear, but the team helps themselves to Ampere's electric gauntlets, giving Taskmaster and Batroc's abilities an extra kick. Taskmaster can't keep Rhino from walking away from the team. Then he shortly makes the call not to help the Manhattan Defenders battle more Symbiote creatures. As the dwindled team slinks away from the scene, they're attacked by a Symbiote creature that's possessed Ampere's corpse and, before they know it, are being chased by a hoard of ravenous Symbiotes. The team escapes to a fishing boat nearly leaving Batroc behind and finally reach their destination: Ravencroft Institute. Inside, they find the man Mayor Fisk believes can defeat Knull: notorious supervillain and former Thunderbolts leader Norman Osborn. Norman Osborn and the Thunderbolts make their way through Ravencroft amidst the Symbiote attacks where they joined up with Figment, Foolkiller, Grizzly, Man-Bull, and Mister Hyde. While noting that Sentry would've been able to fight Knull, it was noted that Knull defeated him and absorbed Void. Osborn then leads the Thunderbolts into retrieving Sentry's corpse so that it can be used as a nuke to destroy Knull's lair on top of the Empire State Building with it being a suicide mission. Foolkiller was taken over by one of the Symbiotes and was killed. Taskmaster used Figment's abilities to make it look like the Thunderbolts sacrificed their lives to pull off the mission. After Mayor Fisk broadcasts the Thunderbolts' sacrifice during the fight against the Symbiote invasion, the Thunderbolts arrive and blackmail him into raising their pay and giving them further missions once Knull is defeated.

Spider-Man gets a panic attack from realizing that he was the reason why the Symbiotes are on Earth. While fighting a Symbiote Dragon, Spider-Man runs into Reptil in his Pteranodon form who is carrying an old woman named Mrs. Volkov who he is trying to get home. While helping Reptil to get Mrs. Volkov to Staten Island, Spider-Man is then attacked by a swarm of Symbiote Dragons. Spider-Man was able to web some of them up as he and Reptil near the Staten Island ferry. Reptil notes that he can't turn into anything big enough to combat a Symbiote Dragon as Spider-Man notes that his Tyrannosaurus form wouldn't work either. Spider-Man then gets an idea as he helps Mrs. Volkov onto the ferry while Reptil dives into the water and emerges as a Mosasaurus which bites into the Symbiote Dragon and drags it underwater. With help from Mrs. Volkov evacuating the passengers to the lifeboats, Spider-Man jury-rigs a harpoon from the ship's generators. When the Symbiote Dragon emerges, Spider-Man quotes Captain Ahab's last words from Moby-Dick and throws the electrified harpoon into the Symbiote Dragon's tongue enough to destabilize and be reduced to goo. Reptil makes it to the surface as Spider-Man states that they should work on saving people.

Issues involved

Prelude issues

Main series

Tie-in issues

Critical reception
The series so far has received positive reviews. According to Comic Book Roundup, the entire series has an average rating of 8.4 out of 10.

Collected editions

Marvel Omnibus

References

Comics set in New York City